Denise Norton was the first South Australian to represent Australia at an Olympic or Commonwealth Games.

Norton won Gold as part of the 4 x 110 yard Freestyle relay and Bronze in the 440 yard Freestyle for the 1950 British Empire Games and was subsequently selected in the Australian Olympic team for Helsinki in 1952, where she competed in the 100 and 400 metre freestyle events.

She was the first inductee into SwimmingSA's Hall of Fame. During her career she broke numerous Australian records.

Park 2 in the Adelaide Park Lands has been named after her.

References

1933 births
Living people
Australian female freestyle swimmers
Sportswomen from South Australia
Swimmers at the 1952 Summer Olympics
Olympic swimmers of Australia
Swimmers at the 1950 British Empire Games
Commonwealth Games medallists in swimming
Commonwealth Games gold medallists for Australia
Commonwealth Games bronze medallists for Australia
Medallists at the 1950 British Empire Games